AM1, AM-1, or variation, may refer to:

AM1 may refer to:
 Austin Model 1, a model used in quantum physics
 BMW AM1, a version of the 1932 BMW 3/20 car
 British Rail Class AM1, a class of electric multiple unit train
 Socket AM1, a CPU socket from AMD for APUs with an integrated chipset
 Air mass 1 solar energy spectra through one atmosphere thickness

AM-1 may refer to: 
 EOS AM-1, a multi-national NASA scientific research satellite in a sun-synchronous orbit around the Earth
 Ekspress AM-1, a Russian Ekspress satellite launched on 30 October 2004
 Sega AM-1, a computer software development studio
 USS Lapwing (AM-1), a 1918 U.S. Navy minesweeper
 AM-1, a designation of the 1946 AM Mauler aircraft
 Arp-Madore 1, a star-cluster
 АМ-1, "Атом Мирный", the first civilian nuclear power reactor in the world.

See also
 AM (disambiguation)